Araeopteron minimale is a species of moth of the  family Erebidae. It is found in the Seychelles on Mahé and Félicité Island.

The wingspan of the adult moths is 10–11 mm.

References

Moths described in 1912
Boletobiinae